Liang Xiao Ping (born 1959), a pioneer in Australian Chinese calligrapher, also an artist, poet and scholar, is the first Chinese Australian artist to exhibit at Parliament House, Canberra. She was born in Guangzhou, China and migrated to Sydney in 1987.

Liang is the founding president of the Australian Oriental Calligraphy Society. The series of her artwork and poetry was presented to 2008 Beijing Olympic Games as a national gift by the Australian Olympic Committee, it is currently housed in National Sports Museum of China. Her artwork 'Rainbow' was collected by the Parliament House of NSW. Her work 'Prajna-Paramita' (Xin Sutra) was collected by the Art Gallery of New South Wales. Her solo exhibition was held by the China National Association of Calligraphers at the National Art Museum of China in Beijing. She was invited by universities such as Stanford University, University of New South Wales and Sydney Conservatorium of Music to have her solo exhibition, academic activities and onsite demonstration.

Major art activities

Other academic work
 Founded the accredited course of Chinese calligraphy for the Department of Chinese Studies, University of New South Wales 
 Founded the course of Chinese brush art for the University of New South Wales College of Fine Arts
 Chief Judge of the First, 3rd, 4th, 5th Annual Australian Oriental Calligraphy Competition in 1992, 1994, 1995, 1996
Lectures and Demonstrations
 2000 Founder and Principal of Academy of Chinese Calligraphy, Sydney
 1995 Art Gallery of NSW, Sydney 
 1995 Brett Whiteley Studio, Sydney
 1995 Produced and presented multicultural art program series on SBS radio station, Sydney

Signature artworks
 Soaring to the Sky
Contemporary calligraphy written on canvas, using acrylic paint. Size: 1.2 m × 1.5 m × 4 pieces
 The Thousand Characters Classic
A Thousand Characters Classic written by Liang Xiao Ping that consists of 88 scrolls (xuan paper mounted on silk scroll) in 21 different styles. Size: 1.35 m  × 0.35 m × 88 pieces
 Endless Joy
Contemporary calligraphy with palindromic couplets written on canvas, using acrylic paint. Size: 1.2 m × 10.5 m
 Prajnaparamita Heart Sutra
This artwork consists of Prajnaparamita written in five styles on xuan paper mounted on silk scrolls. They have been displayed in various exhibitions of Liang Xiao Ping's,  including those held in China National Gallery (Beijing, 1998), Hong Kong City Hall (2001), Parliament House of NSW (2004) and Sydney Conservatorium of Music (2010). Size: 5 m × 1.8 m × 5 pieces
 Poetic Fascination
Three palindromic poem written in the seal script on xuan paper mounted in perspex sheet. They can be viewed both from front and back. This allows each single artwork to have four different narrations. Size: 1.35 m × 0.65 m × 3 pieces
 Eternity
Contemporary calligraphy with palindromic couplets in oracle and cursive scripts, written on canvas using acrylic paint. Size: 1 m × 1.5 m × 4 pieces
 Theme and Variations
Consists of 12 canvases that showcases the elegant morphology of a single art form. This art form can be viewed in three ways:
a. In unison. Size: 2.3 m × 6.1 m × 1 piece
b. As two separate entities where the top rows reflects the contemporary style and the bottom rows represent the traditional long horizontal scrolls. Size: Top 1 m × 6.1 m & Bottom 0.76 m × 6.1 m
c. Each canvas as each individual characters with palindromic effects. This exhibit consists of 6 canvasses of 1.5 m × 1 m and 6 canvasses of 0.6 m × 1 m.
 Paean to the Beijing Olympiad palindromic poems and their expression in Chinese calligraphy
 The originals of the gift to the Chinese Olympic Committee, presented by the Australian Olympic Committee on behalf of the Australian people in 2008. Size: 1.4 m × 0.7 m × 32 pieces

Bibliography
 2014, Liang Xiao Ping's History of Chinese Writing Series – Chinese Calligraphy The Thousand Character Classic Vol. 1 Cursive Script of Liang Xiao Ping's Style 
 2014, Liang Xiao Ping's History of Chinese Writing Series – Chinese Calligraphy The Thousand Character Classic Vol. 2 Bamboo Script of Liang Xiao Ping's Style
 2012, LIANG Xiao Ping • Poetry and Calligraphy • Art and Expression: Splashes of Ink – Tour de Hong Kong (in English and Chinese) 
 2008, Paean to the Beijing Olympiad - A Gift to the 2008 Chinese Olympic Committee presented by the Australian Olympic Committee on behalf of the Australian People - Palindromic Poems and their expression in Chinese Calligraphy by LIANG Xiao Ping (in Chinese, English and French)
 2008, Homage to the Olympic Spirit – The art of Calligraphy by Liang Xiao Ping & Her Student (in Chinese)
 1999, Flowers of Wisdom – Liang Xiao Ping Heart Sutra in Five Scripts (in English, Chinese, Japanese and Korean)
 1999, Chinese Calligraphy – as developed by Liang Xiao Ping (English)
Textbook developed for Chinese calligraphy course in University of New South Wales
 1997, Sayings From Beyond – Chinese Calligraphy in the Brush of Liang Xiao Ping (in English and Chinese)

References

External links
 Liang Xiaoping Calligraphy
 

Australian women artists
Australian people of Chinese descent
Living people
1959 births